Mordellistena exigua is a beetle in the genus Mordellistena of the family Mordellidae. It was described in 1858 by Carl Henrik Boheman.

References

exigua
Beetles described in 1858